Van Wijk is a small lunar impact crater that lies in the southern part of the far side of the Moon. It is located to the north-northwest of the huge walled plain Schrödinger, and to the southwest of the crater Fechner.

The rim of this crater has a noticeable outward bulge toward the south, but it is otherwise relatively circular. The perimeter remains relatively sharp-edged, with some wear along the north and northwest faces. The inner walls slope down evenly towards the relatively flat and featureless interior.

References

 
 
 
 
 
 
 
 
 
 
 
 

Impact craters on the Moon